Roberto Efraín Koichi Aparicio Mori (born 6 June 1992), commonly known as Koichi Aparicio, is a Peruvian footballer of Japanese background who plays for UTC Cajamarca in Torneo Descentralizado. He primarily plays as a central defender.

Club career
Koichi Aparicio made his debut with the Alianza Lima first team in a Torneo Intermedio cup match in 2011, where he partnered Carlos Ascues in the centre of defense and his side eventually lost on penalties away to José Gálvez FBC. This was his only appearance for the first team in 2011, and he would have to wait until the following season to make his league debut.

Aparicio finally made his Torneo Descentralizado league debut in round 35 in the 2–2 draw at home against Universidad César Vallejo.

References

External links

1993 births
Living people
Footballers from Lima
Peruvian people of Japanese descent
Association football central defenders
Peruvian footballers
Peru international footballers
Club Alianza Lima footballers
Club Deportivo Universidad de San Martín de Porres players
Unión Comercio footballers
Sport Huancayo footballers
Universidad Técnica de Cajamarca footballers
Peruvian Primera División players